This is a list of African-American newspapers that have been published in the state of Pennsylvania.

This list includes both current and historical newspapers. In the 19th century, Pennsylvania saw a level of publishing that rivaled New York, with 14 African-American periodicals in circulation from 1838 to 1906. Pennsylvania's first African-American newspaper was The Mystery, published in Pittsburgh by Martin Robison Delany from 1843 to 1847.  

Today, Pennsylvania is home to numerous active African-American newspapers, including the oldest such newspaper nationwide, the Philadelphia Tribune. Other notable current newspapers include the New Pittsburgh Courier and Philadelphia Sunday Sun.

Newspapers

See also 
List of African-American newspapers and media outlets
List of African-American newspapers in Delaware
List of African-American newspapers in Maryland
List of African-American newspapers in New Jersey
List of African-American newspapers in New York
List of African-American newspapers in Ohio
List of newspapers in Pennsylvania

Works cited

References 

Newspapers
Pennsylvania
African-American newspapers
African-American